The Bursa Treasure or Brusa Treasure is the name of an early Roman silver hoard found in the city of Bursa, Turkey. Since 1913, the entire treasure has been at the British Museum.

Discovery and original ownership
In the early 20th century, a rich collection of silver articles was unearthed from a tomb near Bursa in the Marmara Region of Turkey. The exact circumstances of the treasure's discovery remains unclear, but soon after it was found it was sold to the British Museum by the London art dealer W. C. Bacon & Co. The lack of provenance has made it difficult to determine who the hoard originally belonged to, but most of the extant objects indicate that it was probably part of an elite Roman lady's toiletry from the 1st century AD.

Description
The Bursa Treasure is composed of seven silver cosmetic objects that include a distaff, a toilet vessel, a small pyxis with lid, a simpulum or ladle, a spoon with a handle in the shape of a swan, a large mirror and a patera or libation bowl, the back of which has the faint impression of a Chinese silk garment from the Han dynasty. High quality, luxury artefacts made from precious metal are relatively rare from the early decades of the Roman Empire, although there are similar finds  emanating from Pompeii and Boscoreale in southern Italy.

See also
Arcisate Treasure

Gallery

Bibliography
D. Strong, Greek and Roman Silver Plate (British Museum Press, 1966)
L. Burn, The British Museum Book of Greek and Roman Art (British Museum Press, 1991)
S. Walker, Roman Art (British Museum Press, 1991)
H Mangoldt, Der Silberschatz von Brusa/Bursa im British Museum, (British Archaeological Reports, 2005)

References

Ancient Greek and Roman objects in the British Museum
Silver objects
Treasure troves of classical antiquity
History of Bursa